Kaat Van der Meulen (born 22 June 1995) is a retired Belgian professional racing cyclist.

Career results
2016
3rd Team Pursuit, Grand Prix of Poland (with Nathalie Bex, Lenny Druyts and Lotte Kopecky)

See also
 List of 2015 UCI Women's Teams and riders

References

External links

1995 births
Living people
Belgian female cyclists
Place of birth missing (living people)
Sportspeople from Aalst, Belgium
Cyclists from East Flanders
21st-century Belgian women